Victor Morrow (born Victor Morozoff; February 14, 1929 – July 23, 1982) was an American actor. He came to prominence as one of the leads of the ABC drama series Combat! (1962–1967), which earned him an Emmy nomination for Outstanding Continued Performance by an Actor in a Series. Active on screen for over three decades, his film roles include Blackboard Jungle (1955), King Creole (1958), God's Little Acre (1958), Dirty Mary, Crazy Larry (1974), and The Bad News Bears (1976). Morrow continued acting up to his death during filming of Twilight Zone: The Movie (1983) when he and two child actors were killed by a  helicopter crash during filming.

Early years
Morrow was born in the Bronx, New York City, to a middle-class Jewish family. He was a son of Harry Morozoff, an electrical engineer, and his wife Jean (Kress) Morozoff. Morrow dropped out of high school when he was 17 and enlisted in the United States Navy. Morrow and his family lived in Asbury Park, New Jersey for many years.

Career
Morrow attracted attention playing Stanley Kowalski in a touring production of A Streetcar Named Desire. His first movie role was in Blackboard Jungle (1955), playing a thug student who torments teacher Glenn Ford.

It was made by MGM, who then put Morrow in Tribute to a Bad Man (1956). Morrow appeared on television, guest starring on shows like The Millionaire, Matinee Theatre, Climax!, Alfred Hitchcock Presents, The Restless Gun, Trackdown, Richard Diamond, Private Detective, and Telephone Time.

Morrow had support roles in Men in War (1957), directed by Anthony Mann, and was third billed in Hell's Five Hours (1958). He starred alongside Elvis Presley and an all-star supporting cast including Walter Matthau and Carolyn Jones in the movie King Creole (1958), directed by Michael Curtiz. Mann asked him back for God's Little Acre (1958).

However Morrow remained mostly a television actor, appearing in Naked City, Wichita Town, The Rifleman, The Lineup, Johnny Ringo, The Brothers Brannagan, The Law and Mr. Jones, The Lawless Years, The Barbara Stanwyck Show, General Electric Theatre, Target: The Corruptors, The Tall Man, Outlaws, Bonanza, and The Untouchables.

He was cast in the early Bonanza episode "The Avenger" as a mysterious figure known only as "Lassiter" – named after his town of origin – who arrives in Virginia City, and helps save Ben and Adam Cartwright from an unjust hanging, while eventually gunning down one sought-after man, revealing himself as the hunter of a lynch mob who killed his father; having so far killed about half the mob, he rides off into the night, in an episode that resembles the later Clint Eastwood film High Plains Drifter. Morrow later appeared in the third season Bonanza episode "The Tin Badge".

Mann used Morrow a third time in Cimarron (1960), again tormenting Glenn Ford. He took on Audie Murphy in Posse from Hell (1961).

Morrow was cast as soldier-engineer Lt. Robert Benson in the 1962 episode, "A Matter of Honor", on the syndicated anthology series, Death Valley Days, hosted by Stanley Andrews. The story focuses on Benson's fiancé, Indiana (Shirley Ballard), who tries to persuade him to boost their income by selling inside Army information to criminal real estate moguls like Joseph Hooker (Howard Petrie). Trevor Bardette and Meg Wyllie were cast in the roles of Captain and Mrs. Warner.

Morrow had his first leading role in Portrait of a Mobster (1961) playing Dutch Schultz.

He continued as mostly a television actor, appearing in Death Valley Days, Alcoa Premiere, and Suspense.

Combat!

Morrow was cast in the lead role of Sergeant "Chip" Saunders in ABC's Combat!, a World War II drama, which aired from 1962 to 1967. Pop culture scholar Gene Santoro has written:

His friend and fellow actor on Combat!, Rick Jason, described Morrow as "a master director" who directed "one of the greatest anti-war films I've ever seen". He was referring to the two-part episode of Combat! entitled Hills Are for Heroes, which was written by Gene L. Coon.

Deathwatch and A Man Called Sledge
Morrow also worked as a television director. Together with Leonard Nimoy, he produced the 1965 film Deathwatch, an English-language film version of Jean Genet's play Deathwatch (title in ), adapted by Morrow and Barbara Turner, directed by Morrow, and starring Nimoy.

After Combat! ended, Morrow played the lead in Target: Harry (1969), the pilot for a proposed series that was not picked up; Roger Corman directed.

In 1969 he set up his own company, Carleigh.

Morrow wrote and directed a Spaghetti Western, produced by Dino DeLaurentiis, titled A Man Called Sledge (1970) and starring James Garner, Dennis Weaver and Claude Akins. After Deathwatch, it was Morrow's first and only big screen outing behind the camera. Sledge was filmed in Italy with desert-like settings that were highly evocative of the Southwestern United States.

Morrow guest starred in The Immortal, Dan August, Hawaii Five-O, Mannix, Sarge, McCloud, and Owen Marshall, Counselor at Law.

TV movies
In the 1970s Morrow starred in some television movies including A Step Out of Line (1971), Travis Logan, D.A. (1971) (playing the title role), River of Mystery (1971), The Glass House (1972), The Weekend Nun, Tom Sawyer (1973), Nightmare (1974).

He guest starred in Ironside, The Bold Ones: The New Doctors, Mission: Impossible, The FBI, Love Story, The Streets of San Francisco, and Police Story.

Morrow appeared in two episodes of Australian-produced anthology series The Evil Touch (1973), one of which he also directed.

He played the wily local sheriff in director John Hough's road classic Dirty Mary Crazy Larry, as well as the homicidal sheriff, alongside Martin Sheen, in the television film The California Kid (1974), and The Take (1974).

Morrow had the lead in Funeral for an Assassin (1975). He had key roles in Death Stalk (1975), Wanted: Babysitter ( also called Scar Tissue; 1975), The Night That Panicked America (1975), Treasure of Matecumbe (1976) and had a key role as aggressive, competitive baseball coach Roy Turner, in the comedy The Bad News Bears (1976).

In the late 1970s Morrow worked increasingly in miniseries such as Captains and the Kings (1977), Roots and The Last Convertible (1979), as well as guest starring on shows like Bronc, Hunter, The Littlest Hobo and Charlie's Angels.

He returned to directing, helming episodes of Quincy, M.E. as well as Lucan and Walt Disney's Wonderful World of Color.

Final roles
Morrow had the lead in The Ghost of Cypress Swamp (1977), the Japanese film Message from Space (1978) and The Evictors (1979). He  was in TV movies The Man with the Power (1977), The Hostage Heart (1977), Curse of the Black Widow (1977), Wild and Wooly (1978), Stone (1979), Paris (1980)

Morrow made Humanoids from the Deep (1980) for Roger Corman and The Last Shark (1981) and had a regular role in the series, B.A.D. Cats (1980).

Morrow's last roles included guest roles in Charlie's Angels, Magnum, P.I. and the films 1990: The Bronx Warriors (1981) and Abenko Green Berets (1982).

Personal life
In 1958, Morrow married actress and screenwriter Barbara Turner. They had two daughters, Carrie Ann Morrow (1958–2016) and actress Jennifer Jason Leigh (born 1962). Morrow's marriage to Turner ended in divorce after seven years. He married Gale Lester in 1975, but they separated just prior to Morrow's death in July 1982.

Morrow fell out with his daughter Jennifer after his divorce from her mother. She changed her last name to Leigh and they were still estranged at the time of his death.

Rick Jason, co-star of Combat!, wrote in his memoirs that Morrow "had an absolute dislike of firearms. He used a Thompson submachine gun in our series, but that was work. In any other respect he'd have nothing to do with them."

Death

In 1982, Morrow was cast in a feature role in Twilight Zone: The Movie, in a segment directed by John Landis. Morrow was playing the role of Bill Connor, a racist who is taken back in time and placed in various situations where he would be a persecuted victim: as a Jewish man in Vichy France, a black man about to be lynched by the Ku Klux Klan, and a Vietnamese man about to be killed by U.S. soldiers.

In the early morning hours of July 23, 1982, Morrow and two child actors, seven-year-old Myca Dinh Le and six-year-old Renee Shin-Yi Chen, were filming on location in California, in an area that was known as Indian Dunes, near Santa Clarita. They were performing in a scene for the Vietnam sequence, in which their characters attempt to escape out of a deserted Vietnamese village from a pursuing U.S. Army helicopter. Morrow and Le were decapitated and mutilated by the helicopter rotor blades, while Chen was crushed by a helicopter skid.

Landis and four other defendants, including the helicopter pilot Dorsey Wingo, were ultimately acquitted of involuntary manslaughter after a nearly nine-month trial. The parents of Le and Chen sued and settled out of court for an undisclosed amount. Both of Morrow's daughters, notably Jennifer Jason Leigh, also sued and settled for an undisclosed amount.

Morrow's mortal remains are interred in Hillside Memorial Park Cemetery in Culver City, California.

Filmography

Award nominations

References

External links

 
 
 
 Filmography
 Article on Twilight Zone tragedy, written by friend and COMBAT! co-star Dick 'Little John' Peabody
 

1929 births
1982 deaths
20th-century American Jews
20th-century American male actors
Accidental deaths in California
American male film actors
American people of Russian-Jewish descent
American male television actors
American television directors
Burials at Hillside Memorial Park Cemetery
Deaths by decapitation
Film directors from New York City
Filmed deaths of entertainers
Florida State University alumni
American Ashkenazi Jews
Jewish American male actors
Male actors from Los Angeles
Male actors from New York City
Military personnel from New York City
People from the Bronx
United States Navy sailors
Victims of aviation accidents or incidents in 1982
Victims of helicopter accidents or incidents in the United States
Western (genre) television actors